Monument to the Turkmenistan Constitution is a monument located in Ashgabat, Turkmenistan. Its height of 185 meters makes it the second-tallest building in Turkmenistan. The monument is decorated with marble. Built to honor the 20th anniversary of the Constitution of Turkmenistan, it was constructed between 2008 and 2011 on the Archabil avenue, by the Turkish construction company Polimeks. Inside the complex is a museum, a conference room, a library, a gift shop and a cafeteria.

References

External links
 The Constitution Monument - Polimeks

Buildings and structures in Ashgabat
Buildings and structures completed in 2011
Monuments and memorials in Turkmenistan